Tabaluga (also known as Tabaluga & Lilli) is a German animated fantasy musical family film directed by Sven Unterwaldt Jr. and starring Wincent Weiss in the title role. The film is based on the media franchise of the same name created by German Rock musician Peter Maffay. An American version, released in November 2019 on DirecTV and in theaters and on VOD in December 2019, starring Mackenzie Ziegler, was renamed Ice Princess Lily. The story follows a young dragon, Tabaluga, who teams up with an ice princess, Lilli, to save the world from the evil snowman, Arktos.

Synopsis
Tabaluga (the last dragon on Earth), is growing up in lush Greenland. While searching for his dragon fire, he meets a beautiful ice princess, Lilli, from frozen Iceland. The inhabitants of the two lands are highly suspicious of each other, but Tabaluga and Lilli are surprised to find out that the prejudices are wrong, and they like each other. Lilli takes Tabaluga to see Arktos, the ruler of Iceland, not knowing that Arktos has frozen all the dragons and killed Tabaluga's parents. Arktos tries to kill Tabaluga with his magical ice weapons, but Lilli and her polar bear friend Limbo help him to escape and go with him to Greenland. Tabaluga and Lilli begin a romance. Arktos sends an army to invade Greenland. Tabaluga's old raven guardian, Kolk, advises him to visit the wise Nessaja in the swamps, who tells him that his fire was always in his heart, though the dragon does not believe her at first. Lilli returns to Iceland to try to inspire a popular uprising against Arktos, but he captures her and then traps Tabaluga, who follows her. When Arktos moves to kill Lilli, Tabaluga finds his fire and fights against Arktos's ice weapons. Lilli steals Arktos's hat, which blinds Arktos, and Tabaluga is able to melt Arktos to a tiny size; Arktos flees. The Icelanders and Greenlanders become friends.

German voice cast
Wincent Weiss as Tabaluga
Michael Herbig as Glückskäfer Bully, Tabaluga's ladybug friend
Heinz Hoenig as Arktos
Yvonne Catterfeld as Eisprinzessin Lilli (Princess Lilli)
Rick Kavanian as Eisbär Limbo, Lilli's polar bear friend
Peter Maffay as Nessaja, the wise turtle

English voice cast
Cameron Ansell as Tabaluga
Mackenzie Ziegler as Lily (American version)
Kristin Fairlie as Lilli (International version)
Benedict Campbell as Arktos 
Dan Petronijevic as Limbo 
Elizabeth Hanna as Nessaja / Swift 
Ellen-Ray Hennessy as Mythia / Beaver / Ice Lady Bug 
Kevin Dennis as Bully / Snow Kid Rabbit / Male Rabbit 
Richard Waugh as Kolk / Polar Bear / Snowkid Rabbit / Male Rabbit 
Rick Miller as Mirmel / Tyrion / Narrator 
Zach Bennett as Emra / Frog

References

External links
Tabaluga at IMDb
'''Tabaluga to be Released Under the Name Ice Princess in the UK, In English, released date: 11 November 2019 on Home Entertainment. 
Ice Princess Lily, American version, released 21 November 2019 by Viva Pictures on DIRECTV before a theatrical release in December 2019

German animated films
German children's films
German musical films
Animated films about dragons
Animated films about insects
Films about polar bears
2018 films
2018 animated films
Columbia Pictures films
Columbia Pictures animated films
Animated films about bears
Films directed by Sven Unterwaldt
2010s American films
2010s German films